Biyahe ng Pangarap is the first live album and DVD of Filipino rapper Gloc-9, originally released on November 9, 2014. The album featured songs from his previous albums MKNM: Mga Kwento Ng Makata (6 tracks), Liham at Lihim (5 tracks) and Talumpati (1 track). Also, the album has one bonus track (studio recorded) entitled Businessman with former Parokya Ni Edgar vocalist Vinci Montaner arranged by Jazz Nicholas of Itchyworms which also serves as the album's first single.

Track listing

References 

Gloc-9 albums
2014 albums
Universal Records (Philippines) albums